Bekonscot in Beaconsfield, Buckinghamshire, is the oldest original model village in the world. It portrays aspects of England mostly dating from the 1930s.

Bekonscot was created in the 1920s by a Beaconsfield resident, Roland Callingham (1881–1961), and opened to the public on 4 August 1929. Callingham, an accountant, developed the master plan for his miniature empire as an addition to his large back garden, drawing in help from his staff: the gardener, cook, maid and chauffeur. Together they developed the model landscape portraying rural England at the time. The swimming pool became the first "sea" and the undulating rockeries were built up as hills. Bassett-Lowke, the large-scale model railway manufacturers, were commissioned to build an extensive Gauge 1 railway network for the project. Callingham named the village Bekonscot after Beaconsfield and Ascot, where he had lived previously.

Bekonscot was not conceived as a commercial visitor attraction but as a plaything to entertain Callingham and his guests. It was only after 1930 that its existence became widely known, catching the imagination of the press and public alike. Frequent newsreels, such as Pathé, and international and national newspaper coverage, ensured a steady stream of visitors, all of whom were invited to make a donation to the Railway Benevolent Institution.

Bekonscot has been run by the Church Army since 1978 and donates large amounts of money to charity. It has raised the equivalent of almost £5,000,000 and has been visited by more than 14,000,000 people.

Legacy 

Bekonscot is acknowledged to be the inspiration for many other model villages and miniature parks across the world, including Babbacombe, Cockington Green Gardens, Southport, Tucktonia, Madurodam, Bourton-on-the-Water, Wimborne, Great Yarmouth, Clonakilty and Mini-Europe. As such, it is regarded as the "grandfather" of the model village and miniature park movement.

The village expanded in size throughout the first half of the 20th century. Callingham sold off much of the land surrounding the model village, all of which is now a housing estate.  The village is now entirely surrounded by urban development so further expansion is impossible.

Bekonscot popularised the miniature park movement, put Beaconsfield on the map, and has a continuing financial legacy in donations to charitable organisations both national and local.

Miniature landscape 

Buildings are constructed in natural materials, concrete, or dense foam board, and many are originals from the 1920s.

There are six model villages set within the miniature landscape. They are entirely fictional towns, but many buildings within them are based on UK prototypes.  Successive generations of modelmakers, gardeners and craftsmen have left their mark on their subjects, which display a wide range of vernacular architectural styles.

Currently there are 12 full-time staff who maintain the village throughout the year. During the open season a further 20 or so seasonal staff are employed.

Names of shops and other features include humorous puns, such as Lee Key Plumbers' Merchants ('Lee Key' = 'leaky'), Sam and Ella's Butchers ('salmonella') and the Mark Owney Wireless and Gramophone stores ('Marconi'). Other model villages have run with the playful nature of the miniature business names and it has become something of a model tradition.

Notable features

Railways

Gauge 1
Bekonscot's Gauge 1 outdoor model railway is among the largest public garden railways in the UK, at ten scale miles. A custom-built PC-based interface controls the block signalling system, directing up to 12 trains at any one time on prototype routes. In addition there are two manual lever frames, one ex-British Railways (BR) and the other from London Underground. The BR lever frame is still in use as a manual override for the trains. Some original Bassett-Lowke stock from the 1930s is still in daily use, albeit with new running gear. Locomotives include several tank engines, a freelance  tender loco, GWR railmotor, pannier tanks, SR 2BIL EMU, plus assorted others. Many of these trains have significant historical value.

The model railway is not based on any particular prototype but features two stations based on local examples - that at Maryloo High Wycombe and Greenhaily Beaconsfield. There are seven stations in total; others have been inspired by Midland, Great Central and Southern designs. Significant lineside features include several tunnels, a working level crossing and a scaled-down replica of the Sydney Harbour Bridge traversed by the branch line to the coal mine.

The model railway has changed many times over its history since being established in the 1920s. Early photos show a coarse scale Gauge 1 network with several branches, and many sidings, goods yards and express loops, around Maryloo. These were later reduced to enable easier maintenance and a more efficient experience for the visiting public. A branch was added to Evenlode in the 1940s, originally double track throughout with the end looping around a canal basin area, now the site of the coal mine. One part of this loop (single track) was discovered still intact in a ceramic pipe used as a tunnel during excavations in 2002. The branch has subsequently been realigned and singled, with passing loops, and now follows a slightly shortened route. Ideas for extensions and additions have often been considered by staff, which means that the railway has been altered many times.

gauge
A miniature railway known as the Bekonscot Light Railway, providing for passenger rides, was built along the perimeter of the site in 2001. Of  gauge, it was extended in 2004 to a new terminus. Three battery-electric locos haul trains: one a Bo-Bo tram, one a Bo-Bo diesel shunter and one a large 0-4-0 built by Maxitrak. The latter was named "Sprocket" in 2004, the third birthday of the railway and the 75th of the original model village. The two Bo-Bo locomotives were designed and built by the in-house engineering department. Visiting locomotives have included a Maxitrak Opal 0-4-2 tank engine, a County Donegal railbus and a Mardyke InterCity 125.

Two foot gauge
There is also evidence of  narrow gauge railways used on site for construction and later transportation of materials for maintenance. Photographs show the route in 1928 and 1932. Three complete wagon chassis were unearthed in 2003 during excavations for the Bekonscot Light Railway and these have been restored and displayed around the Bekonscot site for posterity.

In popular culture

Bekonscot features prominently in the Will Self short story Scale and was the setting of Beaconsfield-resident Enid Blyton's short story The Enchanted Village. It is also thought to have inspired the series of Borrowers books by Mary Norton.

The non-fiction bestseller Forever England, by Liam Bailey, is a photographic study of the village's miniature characters, whilst Bollocks to Alton Towers, by Hazely et al., celebrates the quirkiness and eccentricity of Bekonscot.

The 2007 song Country Life, by Luke Haines, mentions Bekonscot in its liner notes, and the lyrics use the village as an extended metaphor.

The Penny Peeps released the song "Model Village" in 1968. The single's cover artwork featured Bekonscot.

Owing to Bekonscot's proximity to London and the south-east-based media industry, the village features frequently on television and radio.

Television appearances include:

 Blue Peter (multiple times)
 Treasure Hunt
 Midsomer Murders (the episode Small Mercies, aired 28 October 2009)
 BBC Countryfile
 BBC The One Show (aired 29 January 2010)
 BBC Working Lunch
 McDonald's advertisement
 One Foot in the Past introductory sequence
 Muffin the Mule
 Discovery Home and Leisure's 'Garden Railway' series
 BBC Great British Railway Journeys (season 12 Ep 2)
 The Architecture the Railways Built

Notes

References

External links

 Official website
 The Guardian article
May 1937 National Geographic article
 Bekonscot: The Tim Dunn Interview
 – a journey round the railway filmed from a locomotive

1929 establishments in England
Tourist attractions in Buckinghamshire
Miniature parks
Miniature railways in the United Kingdom
Model railway shows and exhibitions
Beaconsfield